Pools on the Park (previously known as Richmond Baths) is a Grade II listed swimming pool and leisure facility in Old Deer Park in Richmond, London. Construction on the  site started in 1964 and was completed in 1966; the architect was Leslie Gooday. The pool replaced the previous Richmond baths nearby which had been built in Parkshot in 1882.

Pools on the Park is recognised by Historic England as illustrating "the more ambitious use of glazed curtain walling and the post-Wolfenden Report emphasis on providing large banks of spectator seating".

The building, which includes  pool and a learner pool inside, and an open-air pool outside, received a Civic Trust award in 1967.

Richmond Council manages, directly, the pool and leisure facility. Pool on the Park has a long established physiotherapy and osteopathy clinic on site.

Transport
Pools on the Park has its own pay and display car park and is the terminus for London Buses route 490 from Heathrow Terminal 5.

Note

References

External links

Photograph of outdoor pool

1966 establishments in England
Buildings and structures in the London Borough of Richmond upon Thames
Grade II listed buildings in the London Borough of Richmond upon Thames
Old Deer Park
Recipients of Civic Trust Awards
Sport in the London Borough of Richmond upon Thames
Swimming venues in London
Tourist attractions in the London Borough of Richmond upon Thames